John P. "Johnny" Dodd (June 25, 1941 – July 15, 1991) was a lighting designer for theater, dance and music active in the downtown art scene in Manhattan during the latter half of the 20th century.

Career achievements
During the 1960s, Dodd was resident lighting designer at the Caffe Cino. In 1967, he received an Obie Award for his work on Soren Agenoux's A Christmas Carol, Lanford Wilson's The Madness of Lady Bright and Tom Eyen's White Whore and the Bit Player. Dodd also worked on productions at Judson Memorial Church, La MaMa and Theater Genesis. During the 1970s, he served as lighting director on the New York Dolls tours and worked with theater director Robert Wilson. He later founded and served as the president of the 14th Street Stage Lighting Inc. Towards the end of his life, Dodd worked at The Living Theater. In 2011, Fast Books published the book Johnny! by Michael Townsend Smith that recounts much of the life of Johnny Dodd.  In 2017, Fast Books published a book of Johhny Dodd's collages entitled My Funny Valentine Collages under his full name John P. Dodd.

Underground film appearances
Dodd was featured in Andy Warhol's film Haircut No. 3 (1963) and also appeared in Warhol's film Kiss (1964).

Fred Herko suicide
On October 27, 1964, strung out and homeless Andy Warhol superstar Fred Herko went to Johnny Dodd's Cornelia Street apartment to take a bath. According to Dodd, Mozart's Coronation Mass was playing as Herko emerged from the bath and danced naked in the loft. As the music climaxed, Herko leapt through the open window and fell to his death five floors down.

La MaMa credits
Dodd's credits at La MaMa included extensive lighting work as well as some acting and directing:

 Lighting Design
 The Vacation (1964)
 So Who's Afraid of Edward Albee? (1964)
 The Recluse (1964)
 The Hessian Corporal (1966)
 Times Square (1968)
 Melodrama Play (1968)
 Futz (1968)
 Changes (1968)
 9 to 5 to 0 (1969)
 Hurricane of the Eye (1969)
 Solar Inventions (1969)
 A Rat's Mass (1969, 1971)
 In Praise of Folly (1969)
 Wanton Soup (1969)
 Eye in New York (1969)
 Nova (1969)
 Big Charlotte (1969)
 Sprint Orgasmics (1969)
 Cock-Strong (1970)
 Heaven Grand in Amber Orbit (1970)
 Ubu (1970)
 Arden of Faversham (1970)
 Son of Cock-Strong (1970)
 Captain Jack's Revenge (1970)
 Shaved Splits (1970)
 Night Club, or Bubi's Hideaway (1970)
 The Monkeys of the Organ Grinder (1970)
 Toy Show (1970)

 Cranes and Peonies (1970)
 La Cabeza del Bautista (1970)
 La Rosa de Papel (1970)
 Thief (1971)
 The Red Horse Animation (1971)
 Sissy (1972)
 Persia, A Desert Cheapie (1972)
 Satyricon (1972)
 Pomp.eii (1972)
 Audition! (1972)
 Sobechanskaya Dances (1972)
 Thoughts (1972)
 Silver Queen (1973)
 The White Whore and the Bit Player (1973)
 The Golem (1974)
 Stone (1974)
 Big Mother (1974)
 Starfollowers in an Ancient Land (1975)

 Directing
 City of Light (1973)

 Performing
 Times Square (1967)
 Melodrama Play (1967)
 Futz (1967)
 Changes (1968)
 Nova (1969)

Death
Dodd died in 1991, reportedly from AIDS at the age of 50.

Footnotes

References
 Scherman, Tony & Dalton, David, POP: The Genius of Andy Warhol, HarperCollins, New York, N.Y. 2009

External links
 
 
  Biography book Johnny! by Michael Townsend Smith
  My Funny Valentine Collages'' book of collages by John P. Dodd

AIDS-related deaths in New York (state)
American lighting designers
1941 births
1991 deaths
Place of birth unknown